Jane Lumley, Baroness Lumley ( Jane Fitzalan; 1537 – 27 July 1578), sometimes called Joanna, was an English noblewoman. She was the first person to translate Euripides into English.

Life and family
Jane is the eldest child of three siblings, named Henry and Mary FitzAlan, and daughter of Henry FitzAlan, 19th Earl of Arundel and his first wife, Katherine Grey (died 1542). Arundel had Jane and her sister Mary educated very well, and his library, later known as the Lumley Library, was central to this project. She married John Lumley, first Baron Lumley (c. 1533–1609), between 1550 and 1553, when she was 12 or 15. They had three children, all of whom died in childhood. Lumley himself was a scholar, translator and book collector, who supported the literary activities of his wife.

The couple first lived at Lumley Castle in Durham, and then joined Arundel in Nonsuch Palace where Jane nursed her father through illness before predeceasing him. She is interred in the Lumley Chapel in Cheam in south London.

Lady Lumley was first cousin to Lady Jane Grey.

Learning
Lady Lumley's scholarship and learning gained her a considerable contemporary reputation. She translated selected orations of Isocrates from Greek into Latin, and Euripides's Iphigeneia at Aulis from the original Greek (or possibly, according to Caroline Coleman, from Erasmus's Latin translation) into English. Her manuscripts were preserved in her father's library, which was joined, after his death, to John Lumley's own considerable library and then passed into crown control in 1609.

Lady Lumley's translation of Iphigenia is the first known dramatic work to be written by a woman in English, and the first known translation of a classical play into English by any hand.

Death and burial 

Lady Lumley passed away on the 27th of July 1578. In 1596, Lumley's husband John erected a tomb for her in Lumley chapel in St. Dunstan's parish church in Cheam, in which Jane Lumley and her three children were interred.

With the death of Jane, his nephew, Philip Howard was left the sole heir to the titles and vast properties of the FitzAlan family, including the Arundel Castle, estates which Philip received with the death of Henry in February 1580.

References

Sources
Claire Buck, ed. "Lumley, Joanna Fitzalan (c. 1537-1576/77)", The Bloomsbury Guide to Women's Literature. New York: Prentice Hall, 1992, p. 764
Caroline Coleman, "Lumley, Joanna, Lady", British Women Writers: A Critical Reference Guide. London: Routledge, 1989, p. 427

English translators
Lumley
1537 births
1578 deaths
People of the Elizabethan era
English women dramatists and playwrights
Greek–English translators
Daughters of British earls
Wives of knights
Jane
16th-century English women writers
16th-century English writers
16th-century English women
16th-century English dramatists and playwrights